Black One is the fifth album by Sunn O))).  As the title implies, the album is very black metal-influenced; utilizing many guest musicians of the genre including Malefic and Wrest from Xasthur and Leviathan respectively. Allegedly Malefic, a sufferer of claustrophobia, was locked in a casket during his recorded performance to the vocals on the track "Báthory Erzsébet".

2,000 copies included a bonus disc titled Solstitium Fulminate, containing a mix of live performances recorded at Roskilde Festival in 2005 and the immediately preceding European tour.

"Orthodox Caveman", previously known as "Caveman Salad", is based on live material from the White (see Live White) tour. "Báthory Erzsébet" was recorded as a tribute to Quorthon (as well as the countess who inspired Bathory's name) and, according to an interview with Terrorizer magazine, is loosely built "around a really slowed down riff from 'A Fine Day to Die'".

Track listing

Black One
"Sin Nanna" – 2:19
Oren Ambarchi: vocals, bowed cymbals, flies, drums, el. guitars, atmos
"It Took the Night to Believe" – 5:56
Mystik Fogg Invokator: axe, subs
Taoiseach: lead guitar, subs
Wrest: voices
"Cursed Realms (Of the Winterdemons)" (Immortal Cover) – 10:10
Mystik Fogg Invokator: icy inverted crosswinds upon four string zamboni
MK Ultra Blizzard: grail, eclipse, lead guitar
M. Schneeberger: glacial winds
John Wiese: whiteout
Malefic: voice
"Orthodox Caveman" – 10:02
Mystik Fogg Invokator: guitar, riffs
Caveman Skillz: guitar, bass, feedback
Oren Ambarchi: caveman drums
"CandleGoat" – 8:04
Mystik Fogg Invokator: guitar, taurus
MK Ultra Blizzard: decimator bass, crypt calls
John Wiese: casket electronics
Malefic: tundra guitar
"Cry for the Weeper" – 14:38
Mystik Fogg Invokator: guitar, keyboards
SOMA: guitar, virus
Malefic: guitar, keyboards
Oren Ambarchi: el. guitars, horns, wood
"Báthory Erzsébet" – 16:00
Mystik Fogg Invokator: bass
Drone Slut: bass
Count Von Schneeberger: virus
Malefic: calls from beyond the grave
Oren Ambarchi: el. guitars, tubular bells, cymbals, gong

Solstitium Fulminate (limited edition bonus disc)
"Wine & Fog" – 21:29
"Vlad Tepes" – 16:43
Guitar L: Greg Anderson
Guitar R: Stephen O'Malley
Vocals: Attila Csihar
Guitar/electronics: Oren Ambarchi
Analog synths: TOS Nieuwenhuizen

Black One musicians
Malefic (Xasthur)
Wrest (Leviathan, Lurker of Chalice)
Oren Ambarchi
John Wiese (Bastard Noise, Sissy Spacek)
Mathias Schneeberger (credited as Count Von Schneeberger)
Greg Anderson (credited as Mystik Fogg Invokator)
Stephen O'Malley (credited as MK Ultra Blizzard, SOMA, Caveman Skullz, Taoiseach, and Drone Slut)

References

2005 albums
Southern Lord Records albums
Sunn O))) albums
Ambient albums by American artists
Drone music albums by American artists